Kevin O'Brien (born July 1, 1970) is a former professional American football linebacker who played in the Canadian Football League and the World League of American Football. During his career he played for the Sacramento Gold Miners of the CFL, and the Barcelona Dragons of the WLAF.

College career
O'Brien played college football at Bowling Green State University, where he was a two-time All-Mid-American Conference selection.

Professional career

Buffalo Bills
O'Brien was signed by the Buffalo Bills as an undrafted free agent on May 7, 1993. He was waived on August 24.

Barcelona Dragons
The Barcelona Dragons selected O'Brien in the 26th round of the 1995 World League Draft. He finished the season with 6.5 sacks and earned first-team All-World League honors.

New England Patriots
Following the World League season, O'Brien was signed by the New England Patriots on July 11, 1995. The Patriots waived him on August 14.

References

External links
Career statistics at The Football Database

1970 births
Living people
American football linebackers
Bowling Green Falcons football players
Sacramento Gold Miners players
Barcelona Dragons players